The 1960 Little All-America college football team is composed of college football players from small colleges and universities who were selected by the Associated Press (AP) as the best players at each position. For 1960, the AP selected three teams of 11 players each, with no separate defensive platoons.

Halfback Dale Mills of Northeast Missouri State rushed for 1,343 and concluded his college career with 4,502 rushing yards and over 400 points scored.

Charles Fuller of San Francisco State rushed for 892 yards (7.2 yards per carry) and scored 104 points.

Bill Cooper of Muskungum rushed for 1,102 yards, 23 touchdowns, and scored 152 points. His coach, Ed Sherman, called him "the greatest player I've ever coached or seen in the Ohio Conference."

Bucknell quarterback Paul Terhes passed for 981 yards and nine touchdowns.

End John Simko of Augustana (South Dakota) broke a North Central Conference record with 53 receptions. He was the first Augustana player to receive first-team Little All-America honors.

Center Dick Grecni anchored the line for an undefeated Ohio team that outscored opponents, 269 to 34, and was recognized by both the AP and UPI as the small college champion.

First team
 Back - Paul Terhes, Bucknell
 Back - Dale Mills, Northeast Missouri State Teachers
 Back - Charles Fuller, San Francisco State
 Back - Bill Cooper, Muskungum
 End - Tom Hackler, Tennessee Tech
 End - John Simko, Augustana (South Dakota)
 Tackle - Charlie Long, Chattanooga
 Tackle - Willie Crafts, Texas A&I
 Guard - George Asleson, Iowa State Teachers
 Guard - Doug Brown, Fresno State
 Center - Dick Grecni, Ohio

Second team
 Back - Dennis Spurlock, Whitworth
 Back - Lee Farmer, Lenoir Rhyne
 Back - Bernie Casey, Bowling Green
 Back - Joe Iacone, West Chester
 End - Powell McClellan, Arkansas Tech
 End - Al Ferrie, Wagner
 Tackle - Vester Flanagan, Humboldt State
 Tackle - Jim Larkin - Jim Larkin, Hillsdale
 Guard - Joe Hinton, Louisiana Tech
 Guard - Houston Antwine, Southern Illinois
 Center - Curtis Miranda, Florida A&M

Third team
 Back - Jerry Morgan, Iowa State Teachers
 Back - Roger Johnson, Whitewater State
 Back - Donald Lee Smith, Langston
 Back - Charles Miller, Austin
 End - Bill Wiljanen, Michigan Tech
 End - Willie Richardson, Jackson State
 Tackle - Jim Kelley, Johns Hopkins
 Tackle - Bill Ogden, Presbyterian
 Guard - Dick DeMasi, Montclair State
 Guard - Blayne Jones, Idaho State
 Center - Terry Fohs, Washington & Lee

See also
 1960 College Football All-America Team

References

Little All-America college football team
Little All-America college football team
Little All-America college football teams